Cloake is a surname. Notable people with the surname include:

Felicity Cloake, British food writer
John Cloake (1924–2014), British historian and author
Daniel Cloake, Sussex police drugs expert

See also
Cloake board, equipment used in beekeeping
Cloke

English toponymic surnames